Sir William George Johnson, 4th Baronet of New York (19 December 1830 – 26 January 1908) was an English soldier and aristocrat.

Early life
Johnson was born on 19 December 1830 at Point Olivier in Montreal, Canada. He was the son of John Johnson (1782–1841) and Mary Diana Dillon (1809–1861).

His father was the sixth son of his grandparents Sir John Johnson, 2nd Baronet, a Loyalist leader during the American Revolution, and his wife, Mary Nicoll "Polly" Watts, daughter of John Watts, President of the King's Council, of New York and descendant of the Schuyler, Van Cortlandt and Delancey families. Among his prominent extended family was uncle Major-General Barnard Foord Bowes, the husband of his aunt Catherine Maria Johnson.

Upon the death of his uncle, Adam Gordon Johnson, who died on May 21, 1843 without male issue, young William became the 4th Baronet Johnson and heir to the Johnson estate.

Career
After graduating from the Royal Military Academy, Woolwich, he spent the greater part of his life engaged in the British Army, serving various duties, including as the aide-de-camp to the Governor on the Island of Saint Helena, after it became a crown colony in 1834.

From 1848, until his resignation in 1854, he was a lieutenant of Royal Artillery. Thereafter, he was a lieutenant in the Falmouth Division of Royal Engineers.

Personal life
On 30 March 1889, Sir William was married to Elizabeth Hancock Brown (d. 1932), the only daughter of Richard Hancock Brown of Bowdon, county of Chester in England.

He died, without issue, on 26 January 1908.  His nephew Edward Gordon Johnson (1867–1957), son of his younger brother Archibald Kennedy Johnson (1839–1873) (named after his grandfather's brother-in-law, Archibald Kennedy, 11th Earl of Cassilis),  and Catherine Sophia (née MacDonnell) Johnson, succeeded him in the baronetcy.

References

External links
 

1830 births
1908 deaths
Baronets in the Baronetage of Great Britain
O'Neill dynasty
Graduates of the Royal Military Academy, Woolwich